Drosophila colorata is a species of vinegar fly in the family Drosophilidae. It is found in the United States.

References

Further reading

 Arnett, Ross H. (2000). American Insects: A Handbook of the Insects of America North of Mexico. CRC Press.

External links

 Diptera.info
 NCBI Taxonomy Browser, Drosophila colorata

colorata